"On Again Tonight" is a song recorded by American country music artist Trent Willmon.  It was released in February 2006 as the first single from the album A Little More Livin'.  The song reached #27 on the Billboard Hot Country Songs chart.  The song was written by Marv Green, Phillip White and Jimmy Melton.

Chart performance

References

2006 singles
2006 songs
Trent Willmon songs
Songs written by Marv Green
Song recordings produced by Frank Rogers (record producer)
Columbia Records singles